Paradise Again is the debut studio album by Swedish house music supergroup Swedish House Mafia, released on 15 April 2022 through SSA Recording and Republic Records. The album features guest appearances from 070 Shake, ASAP Rocky, Connie Constance, Jacob Mühlrad, Mapei, Seinabo Sey, Sting, Ty Dolla Sign and the Weeknd.

Four singles were released from the album, with the third single "Moth to a Flame", a collaboration with the Weeknd, peaking at number two on Billboards Hot Dance/Electronic Songs chart. To promote the album, Swedish House Mafia embarked on the Paradise Again World Tour and headlined the Coachella Valley Music and Arts Festival alongside the Weeknd.

Background
 In February 2021, Swedish House Mafia's art director Alexander Wessley and their manager Max Holmstrand shared videos of the supergroup working on new music. One month after the videos were published, the supergroup parted ways with their former record label Columbia Records. In April, the supergroup signed with manager Wassim "Sal" Slaiby, hinting at a potential collaboration with his longtime client the Weeknd. On July 15, Swedish House Mafia announced that they have signed to Republic Records and that they intended to release their debut studio album, Paradise Again, later that year. Following the announcement, the supergroup released the album's lead single "It Gets Better". On 19 July, the supergroup released the album's second single "Lifetime" with Ty Dolla Sign and 070 Shake. The album's third single "Moth to a Flame" with the Weeknd, was released on 22 October.

On 10 February 2022, Swedish House Mafia announced that they have finished recording Paradise Again. On 3 March, the supergroup released the album's fourth single "Redlight" with Sting, and revealed that Paradise Again is now scheduled to be released on 15 April. The supergroup revealed the album's tracklist on 7 April. On the same day, they revealed the artwork, stating that each particle in the artwork represents "a minute in the life" of the group, marking it as a timeline from the day the group was formed leading up to the album's release.

Promotion
Swedish House Mafia performed a medley of "It Gets Better" and "Lifetime" on the Tonight Show Starring Jimmy Fallon and on the pre-show at the 2021 MTV Video Music Awards. In October 2021, to celebrate the release of "Moth to a Flame", the supergroup hosted the twentieth episode of the Weeknd's Apple Music 1 radio show Memento Mori. The same month, the supergroup announced their first tour in ten years, the Paradise Again World Tour, which is scheduled to commence in July 2022.

In January 2022, Swedish House Mafia was confirmed to headline the Coachella Valley Music and Arts Festival at an unspecified date. In April, ten days before the festival began, the supergroup were announced to be taking over Kanye West's Sunday spot after he dropped out, while also revealing that they would be headlining the show alongside the Weeknd.

Critical reception

"Paradise Again" received generally positive reviews from music critics. At Metacritic, which assigns a normalised rating out of 100 to reviews from mainstream publications, the album received an average score of 67 based on four reviews, indicating "generally favorable reviews".

The Groove Cartel commended the album, calling it "a 360° exploration of electronic music". Ali Shutler of NME praised Swedish House Mafia for taking risks "rather than sounding like a vintage group struggling to find their identity" and that the album has the trio "flexing their musical and emotional muscles across 17 brilliant, fearless and often surprising tracks. The kings of dance music are very much back".

Track listing
All tracks are produced by Swedish House Mafia and Desembra, except where noted.Sample credits"Don't Go Mad" contains a sample of "Summer Nights", written by Lonnie Liston Smith Jr., as performed by Lonnie Liston Smith and The Cosmic Echoes.
"Calling On" contains a sample of "In the Garden", written and as performed by Cassietta George.
"It Gets Better" contains a sample of "Lightning's Girl", written by Lee Hazlewood, as performed by Nancy Sinatra; and a sample of "One More Time", written by Al Mack, as performed by Divas of Color featuring Evelyn "Champagne" King.
"Redlight" contains an interpolation of "Roxanne", written by Sting, as performed by The Police.

PersonnelSwedish House Mafia Axwell – bass guitar, keyboards (tracks 1, 2, 4, 5, 7, 8, 10, 11, 13–15, 17); drums, keyboards, programming (1, 2, 5, 7, 8, 10, 11, 13–15, 17); drum programming (4), engineering (all tracks)
 Steve Angello – bass guitar, keyboards (1, 2, 4, 5, 7, 8, 10, 11, 13–15, 17); drums, programming (1, 2, 5, 7, 8, 10, 11, 13–15, 17); drum programming (4), engineering (all tracks)
 Sebastian Ingrosso – bass guitar, keyboards (1, 2, 4, 5, 7, 8, 10, 11, 13–15, 17); drums, programming (1, 2, 5, 7, 8, 10, 11, 13–15, 17); drum programming (4), engineering (all tracks)Additional musicians Carl Nordström – bass guitar, keyboards (1, 2, 4, 5, 7, 8, 11, 13–15, 17); drums, programming (1, 2, 5, 7, 8, 11, 13–15, 17); drum programming (4)
 Dice of Nights – bass guitar, drums, keyboards, programming (1)
 Killen Manjaro – bass guitar, drums, keyboards, programming (1)
 Johannes Klahr – bass guitar, drums, keyboards, programming (2)
 070 Shake – vocals (9, 16)
 Ty Dolla Sign – vocals (9)
 Fred Again – bass guitar, drums, keyboards, programming (10)
 Giampaolo Parisi – bass guitar, drums, keyboards, programming (10)
 Marco Parisi – bass guitar, drums, keyboards, programming (10)Technical'
 Jay Reynolds – mastering (1, 10), mixing (1, 7, 10)
 Kevin Grainger – mastering (1–3, 7, 11, 13–15, 17), mixing (2, 3, 11, 13–15, 17)
 Mike Dean – mastering, mixing (4–6, 8, 9, 12, 16)
 Salem Al Fakir – engineering (1, 16)
 Vincent Pontare – engineering (1, 16)
 Carl Nordström – engineering (2, 7, 11, 14–17)
 Johannes Klahr – engineering (2)
 Todd Cooper – engineering (2)
 Jacob Mühlrad – engineering (3)
 Shin Kamiyama – engineering (4)
 Fred Again – engineering (10)
 Parisi – engineering (10)
 Magnus Lidehäll – vocal production (2)
 Kelvin Krash – vocal production (6)
 Martin Kierszenbaum – vocal production (13)
 Grant Valentine – vocal engineering (13)

Charts

Weekly charts

Year-end charts

References

2022 debut albums
Swedish House Mafia albums
Republic Records albums
Albums produced by Fred Again
Albums produced by Swedish House Mafia